Girl on the Spot is a 1946 musical crime film directed by William Beaudine and starring Lois Collier, Jess Barker and George Dolenz.

Partial cast
 Lois Collier as Kathy Lorenz 
 Jess Barker as Rick Crane  
 George Dolenz as Leon Lorenz 
 Fuzzy Knight as Bim  
 Ludwig Stössel as 'Popsy' Lorenz  
 Richard Lane as 'Weepy' McGurk  
 Donald MacBride as Inspector Gleason  
 Edward Brophy as Fingers Foley
 Ray Walker as Don Dawson
 Carol Hughes as Susie 'Cuddles' LaPlanche (uncredited)

References

Bibliography
 Elizabeth Leese. Costume Design in the Movies: An Illustrated Guide to the Work of 157 Great Designers. Courier Corporation, 2012.

External links
 

1946 films
1946 crime films
1940s English-language films
American crime films
Films directed by William Beaudine
Universal Pictures films
American black-and-white films
American musical films
1946 musical films
Films scored by Paul Sawtell
1940s American films